The Hydrobiosidae are a family of caddisflies in the insect order Trichoptera. The family contains two subfamilies with about 50 genera.

References

Trichoptera families
Spicipalpia